The Golden Eagle Award for Best Leading Actress is one of twenty award categories presented annually by the National Academy of Motion Pictures Arts and Sciences of Russia. It is one of the Golden Eagle Awards, which were conceived by Nikita Mikhalkov as a counterweight to the Nika Award established in 1987 by the Russian Academy of Cinema Arts and Sciences.

Each year the members of the academy choose three leading actresses and the film as a perception. The first actress to be awarded was Natalya Gundareva for the film Rostov-Papa. The most recent award was made to Olga Ozollapinya in A Siege Diary. Anna Mikhalkova, Kseniya Rappoport, and Elena Lyadova all hold the record for the most wins (with two each). Renata Litvinova had the most nominations, but has not yet received the award.

Nomineess and Awardees
Key

Gallery

References

External links
 

Actress
Lists of films by award
Film awards for lead actress